School District 117 may refer to:
 Jacksonville School District 117
 North Palos School District 117
 Community High School District 117